Fyodor Petrovich Simashev (13 March 1945 – 19 December 1997) was a Russian cross-country skier who competed at the 1968 and 1972 Winter Olympics. In 1968 he only entered the 15 km race and placed 26th. In 1972 he won a gold medal in the 4×10 km and a silver in the 15 km, placing sixth-eighth in the 30 km and 50 km events. He won another relay gold medal and two individual medals at the 1970 World Championships. Domestically he won twelve Soviet titles: in the 15 km (1968), 30 km (1969, 1971, 1973), 50 km (1974) and 4×10 km relay (1968–70, 1972, 1973, 1975, 1976). In 1972 he was awarded Order of the Badge of Honor.

After retiring from competitions Simashov worked as a sports official in Zainsk until his death in 1997. Since 1971, an annual junior cross-country skiing competition in his honor has been held in Zainsk.

References

External links
 
 
 
 
 

1945 births
1997 deaths
Olympic cross-country skiers of the Soviet Union
Olympic gold medalists for the Soviet Union
Olympic silver medalists for the Soviet Union
Soviet male cross-country skiers
Dynamo sports society athletes
Russian male cross-country skiers
Cross-country skiers at the 1968 Winter Olympics
Cross-country skiers at the 1972 Winter Olympics
Olympic medalists in cross-country skiing
FIS Nordic World Ski Championships medalists in cross-country skiing
Medalists at the 1972 Winter Olympics
Universiade medalists in cross-country skiing
Universiade gold medalists for the Soviet Union
Competitors at the 1970 Winter Universiade
Competitors at the 1972 Winter Universiade
Sportspeople from Tatarstan